José Vespasien (born April 1, 1976 in Villeurbanne, France) is a French basketball player who played 26 games for the French Pro-A league club Dijon during the 2002–2003 season.

References

External links
 Ligue Nationale de Basket

French men's basketball players
1976 births
Living people
People from Villeurbanne
Sportspeople from Lyon Metropolis